The 1993 UEFA European Under-16 Championship was the eleventh edition of UEFA's European Under-16 Football Championship. Turkey hosted the championship, between 24 April – 8 May 1993. 16 teams entered the competition, and Poland defeated Italy in the final to win the competition for the first time.

Squads

Participants

Group stage

Group A

Group B

Group C

Group D

Knockout stage

Quarter-finals

Semi-finals

Third-place play-off

Final

References
RSSSF.com
UEFA.com

1993
UEFA
1992–93 in Turkish football
European 1993
U
1993 European Under-16
Sport in Yalova
April 1993 sports events in Europe
May 1993 sports events in Europe
1993 in youth association football